Moussa Koné may refer to:

Moussa Koné (Ivorian footballer), Ivorian football midfielder
Moussa Koné (Malian footballer), Malian football midfielder
Moussa Koné (Senegalese footballer), Senegalese football forward
Moussa Konè (footballer, born 2000), Ivorian football midfielder